Rose Hill School is a co-educational preparatory school in Royal Tunbridge Wells, Kent, England. It is a member of the Independent Association of Preparatory Schools.

Notable former pupils 

 Robert Baden-Powell, 1st Baron Baden-Powell

References

External links 
 
 Independent Association of Preparatory Schools website

Preparatory schools in Kent
Royal Tunbridge Wells